Furomurotsutsumi Dam is an earthfill dam located in Yamagata Prefecture in Japan. The dam is used for irrigation. The catchment area of the dam is 0.8 km2. The dam impounds about 4  ha of land when full and can store 73 thousand cubic meters of water. The construction of the dam was completed in 1948.

References

Dams in Yamagata Prefecture
1948 establishments in Japan